Acoustic is a live album by the French covers band Nouvelle Vague, recorded at a concert at the Auditório Municipal Augusto Cabrita in Barreiro, Portugal. All songs are acoustic versions of songs from the band's studio albums Nouvelle Vague, Bande à Part and 3, except for "Sweet Dreams" and "Relax" which do not appear on any of those albums.

Critical reception

PopMatters wrote that the album "succeeds where so many [live albums] have failed, by creating a loose and free-wheeling sound which should please listeners today, as much as it appears to have pleased the assembled crowd back in 2009."

Track listing

References 

2009 live albums
Nouvelle Vague (band) albums
Covers albums